Located in Oceania, Tonga is a small archipelago in the South Pacific Ocean, directly south of Samoa and about two-thirds of the way from Hawaii to New Zealand. It has 169 islands, 36 of them inhabited, which are in three main groups – Vavaʻu, Haʻapai, and Tongatapu – and cover an -long north–south line. The total size is just .

Geologically the Tongan islands are of two types: most have a limestone base formed from uplifted coral formations; others consist of limestone overlaying a volcanic base.

Climate
The climate is tropical with a distinct warm period (December–April), during which the temperatures rise above , and a cooler period (May–November), with temperatures rarely rising above . The average wettest period is around March with on average . The average daily humidity is 80%. Cyclones can occur from October to April.

Geology
Though administratively divided into the three main island groups of Tongatapu, Ha'apai, and Vava'u (excluding the outlying islands), the Tonga archipelago is actually made of two geologically different parallel chains of islands.

The western islands, such as ʻAta (also known as Pylstaart island), Fonuafo'ou, Tofua, Kao, Lata'iki, Late, Fonualei, Toku, Niuatoputapu, and Tafahi, make up the Tongan Volcanic Arc and are all of volcanic origin.  They were created from the subduction of the westwards-moving Pacific plate under the Australia-India plate at the Tonga Trench.  The Tongan Islands sit on the Australia-India plate just west of the Tonga Trench. These volcanoes are formed when materials in the descending Pacific plate heat and rise to the surface. There is only limited coral reef development on these islands, except for Niuatoputapu.

The eastern islands are not volcanic and sit above the mostly submerged Tonga ridge that runs parallel to the Tongan Volcanic Arc and the Tongan Trench. Of these islands, only 'Eua has risen high enough to expose its underlying Eocene volcanic bedrock, the rest are either low coral limestone islands (Tongatapu, Vava'u, Lifuka) or sand cay islands ('Uoleva, 'Uiha).  These islands are surrounded by "a protective and resource-rich labyrinth of fringing, apron and off-shore barrier reefs" that have supported most of the human settlement in Tonga ever since the first Lapita People arrived circa 900 BCE.

The Tongan Volcanic Arc has been important in supplying the islands on the Tonga ridge with an andesite tephra soil that has resulted in "an extremely rich soil capable of supporting a high-yield, short-fallow agricultural system."  Also, the andesite/basalt from the volcanoes were initially used as "hammerstones, weaving weights, cooking stones, and decorative pebbles for grave decoration."  Tafahi island in the far north provided volcanic glass to initial human settlers.

In December 2014 and January 2015, a volcanic island 1 km wide by 2 km long was created adjacent to the island of Hunga Tonga–Hunga Ha'apai 65 kilometers northwest of Nuku'alofa. The volcanic eruption has built the new island to a height of 100 m composed of ash and large rock fragments. In regards to volcanism, Tonga has moderate volcanic activity. Fonualei (elev. 180 m) has shown frequent activity in recent years, while Niuafo'ou (elev. 260 m), which last erupted in 1985, has forced evacuations; other historically active volcanoes include Late and Tofua. Natural hazards include earthquakes and volcanic activity at Fonuafo'ou (Falcon Shoal/Island) and Late'iki (Metis Shoal/Island).

Facts

Geographic coordinates: 

Area:
total: 
land: 
water: 

Coastline:

Maritime claims:
continental shelf:
 depth or to the depth of exploitation
exclusive economic zone:
 and 
territorial sea:

Elevation extremes:
lowest point:
Pacific Ocean 
highest point:
unnamed location on Kao 

Land use:
arable land:
21.33%
permanent crops:
14.67%
other:
64.00% (2011)

Environment - international agreements:
party to:
Biodiversity, Climate Change, Climate Change Kyoto-Protocol, Desertification, Law of the Sea, Marine Dumping, Marine Life Conservation, Ozone Layer Protection, and Ship Pollution.

Natural resources are fish and fertile soil. Current environmental issues are deforestation as more and more land is being cleared for agriculture and settlement; some damage to coral reefs from starfish and indiscriminate coral and shell collectors; and overhunting threatens native sea turtle populations.

See also
Tongan tropical moist forests
List of islands and towns in Tonga

References

Sources

World Factbook